An emerging power or rising power is a state or union of states with significant rising influence in global affairs. Such a power aspires to have a more powerful position or role in international relations, either regionally or globally, and possess sufficient resources and levels of development that such goals are potentially achievable.

Characteristics 
There are few available conceptualizations of the term "emerging power". Therefore, there is no standard or agreed method to decide which states are emerging powers. However, a fundamental characteristic of an emerging power is that it is also an emerging economy, being that economic development is necessary and preliminary to political and military emergence. It has been argued that while a country may be an emerging power, it is above anything else an emerging economy with only the potential or hope of increasing their global influence. This is because of several limiting factors, largely the seven dimensions of state power: geography, population, economy, resources, military, diplomacy, and national identity. Traditionally, only great powers or superpowers have succeeded in all seven dimensions of state power.

The BRICS are often cited as being emerging powers, but at varying stages of development and of varying degrees of potential. For example, Russia, which was once a superpower, is now re-emerging in some aspects of state power following the fall of the Soviet Union. China and India are emerging as potential superpowers, while Brazil is emerging as a possible great power.

List of emerging powers 
The term emerging power is often used to delineate the following G20 countries:
Advanced Economies and/or Developed Countries of the G20 major economies
 
 
 
 
 

Emerging Markets and/or Developing Countries of the G20 major economies
 
 
 
 
 
 
 
 
 
 

Although there is no exact and agreed upon definition of what constitutes an emerging power, the term has sometimes been also applied to the following other countries:

See also 

 Middle power
 MINT (economics)
 G20
 G4 nations
 Asian Century

References

External links
 Centre for Rising Powers, University of Cambridge
 Rising Powers Initiative, George Washington University
 Rising Powers In International Development Programme 
 Post Western World, Getúlio Vargas Foundation
 Project on International Order and Strategy, Brookings Institution

21st century in politics
Emerging power
Rises to prominence